Crocodile Hunter (專釣大鱷) is a 1989 Hong Kong action comedy film written and directed by Wong Jing, and starring Andy Lau as an ace police officer who teams up with his less than competent subordinate (Alex Man) to capture a group of wanted thieves with bounties on their heads.

Plot
While on duty saving hostages in a movie theater, Special Duties Unit officer Happy Chiu (Andy Lau) is shot in the head by a criminal disguised as a hostage and is hospitalized for nine months. Despite having a bullet lodged in his head, Happy refuses to retire so he applies to transfer as a senior inspector of the Criminal Investigation Department (CID) to earn cash to pay for his mother's (Soh Hang-suen) kidney transplant operation. At this time, a group of thieves led by Prince (Lung Fong) have escaped from prison and the police have issued a bounty of HK$800,000 to have them captured, so Happy assigns his CID detective Bad Odor Chuen (Alex Man), a cowardly, incompetent, officer who was previously humiliated by Prince's underling, Shrimp (Eddie Mauher), who forced Chuen to undress himself at gunpoint. Lam Tin-fu (Ricky Wong), elder son of Lam's Group CEO Lam Yuet-ting (Foo Wang-tat), is unhappy that his father appointing his younger brother (Jimmy Wong) to be his successor, so he hires Prince to stage a robber at Lam's Group to get his father and brother killed.

Happy and Chuen then tricks Bitchy Ying (Sandra Ng), the imprisoned girlfriend of Stalled Engine Tak (Cheung Kwok-keung), who is the computer hacker in Prince's gang, into work with them by paying her fellow prisoners to threaten her. Happy is then informed by his superior, Superintendent Wai (Lau Kong), that TV actress Lam Ka-sin (Elvina Kong) is being stalked by another one of Prince's underling, Convulsion (Frankie Chan) and rushes to her apartment with Chuen and narrowly saves her from being killed by Convulsion and bring her to the safe house where she gets into a fight with Ying as they were childhood rivals. When Prince sees Tak calling his mother asking the whereabouts of Ying, Tak reveals to Prince that Ying is held by Happy and Chuen at Kowloon Peak and pleads Prince to save her, but he and his gang shoots up the safehouse and also shoots Ying (who was wearing a bullet vest given by Chuen) and lies to Tak that his girlfriend has died but still convinces Tak to work for him. Tak then requests a computer to practice his hacking skills and uses it to send a tip that Prince is robbing the Lam's Building Saturday at 7 PM to his computer at home, which is seen by his family along with Chuen and Ying, who were visiting his family for tips. Happy and Chuen then tails Lam Tin-fu, which irritates the latter, who then frames the two for assaulting him. Happy and Chuen are put under investigation and suspended from their duties, but Superintendent Wai purposely gives them their suspension letters without a start date to allow them to continue to work on the case.

On the night Lam Yuet-ting announces to pass down his position as CEO to his second son, Prince and his gang arrives and holds a number of rich guests hostage while demanding Lam to bring him to the antique vault in the company to obtain the priceless Along the River During the Qingming Festival painting inside. Chuen and Ying were tied up by Shrimp, who forced them to undress themselves, while Happy saves the hostages and keeps them safe locked inside the elevator. Prince then reveals to Lam Ting-yuet that Tin-fu colluded with him before killing the latter and Ting-yuet gives the password to the vault before being killed by Prince. Happy arrives in time and save Lam's second son while Tak smashes the computer to the vault which triggers the alarm to the police and was shot by Prince. Chuen and Ying manages to untie themselves and the latter finds Tak who opens the vault and take the priceless painting for themselves. Happy shoots the rest of Prince's gang and kills Convulsion in fight, while Chuen kills Shrimp after re-enacting their first encounter.

Prince pretends to be a hostage and escapes after knocking out an officer, but Happy catches up with him in the parking lot but is at an disadvantage when he drops his glasses. Fortunately, Tak and Ying arrive to help him and Happy kills Prince by throwing and impaling him with a pen belonging to his deceased journalist father. Chuen is then reunited with his estranged wife (Rosamund Kwan) and daughter after witness his heroic acts on live news.

Cast 
 Andy Lau as Happy Chiu (趙快樂), former Special Duties Unit (SDU) officer who transfers to the Criminal Investigation Department (CID) as a senior inspector after getting shot in an operation, hoping to earn bounty money in order to pay for her mother to get a kidney transplant in the United States. He is brave, confident and physically talented, and is skilled at throwing chopsticks in a way similar to knife throwing.
 Alex Man as Sau Hau-chuen (仇厚全), nicknamed Bad Odor Chuen (臭口全), an incompetent and cowardly CID detective who is assigned by Happy to be his assistant and partner.
 Cheung Kwok-keung as Stalled Engine Tak (死火德), an expert computer hacker with knowledge in opening FV-28 safes who is forced by Prince to work for him.
 Sandra Ng as Bitchy Ying (倀雞英), Tak's loud-mouthed, cocky girlfriend who was tricked by Happy and Chuen to work with them and briefly has relationship with the latter during the process.
 Elvina Kong as Lam Ka-sin (藍嘉倩), an attention-seeking TV star and Ying's childhood rival who is stalked by Convulsion.
 Lung Fong as Prince (公子), the  slimy, manipulative and ruthless leader of the gang of  thieves who would give his underlings once their worth is gone.
 Lau Kong as Superintendent Wai (韋Sir), Happy's superior officer and close friend.
 Rosamund Kwan as Chuen's estranged wife who left him with their daughter due to his cowardness and incompetence. (cameo)
 Frankie Chan as Convulsion (抽筋), Prince's underling who is sex maniac and stalks Ka-sin.
 Shing Fui-On as Officer Kong (江Sir), an SDU team captain who is jealous of Happy's confidence.
 Soh Hang-suen as Happy mother who suffers from kidney problems.
 Stephen Chan as Lee Pang (李鵬), Prince's underling who is hot-headed and abrasive.
 Kan Tat-wah as Portuguese (西洋仔), Prince's underling who was killed by his boss after he was shot by Happy in a gunfight.
 Ricky Wong as Lam Tin-fu (林天富), Lam Yuet-ting's elder son who is unhappy that his father is passing his position as CEO to his younger brother and hires Prince to kill the two.
 Ma Kai
 Foo Wang-tat as Lam Yuet-ting (林月亭), CEO of Lam's Group (林氏集團) who appoints his second son as his successor.
 Sherman Wong as a police officer.
 Jimmy Wong as Lam Yuet-ting's second son who is appointed by his father as his successor to his company.
 Charlie Cho as Chu Lei-ngan (朱利銀), a barrister who courts Ka-sin and was killed by Convulsion.
 Chan King as Lee Pang
 Eddie Maher as Shrimp (鹹蝦), Prince's underling who likes to force his victims to undress themselves.
 Liu Fan as prisoner paid by Happy to threaten Ying.
 Ronald Wong as Fink Fai (二五輝), Chuen's informant.
 Maria Cordero as Lam Ka-sin's assistant.
 Tang Tai-wo as one of rich party guests at Lam's Group.
 Cheung Kwok-wah as one of Tak's relatives.
 Yeung Jing-jing as one of Tak's relatives.
 Lam Kai-wing as The Red (赤軍), Prince's underling.
 Cynthia Khan (cut scene)
 Cheng Ka-sang as one of tak's relatives.
 Fan Chin-hung as a gangster.
 Derek Kok as one of rich party guests at Lam's Group.

See also
Andy Lau filmography
Wong Jing filmography

External links

1989 films
1989 martial arts films
1980s action comedy films
1980s buddy cop films
Hong Kong action comedy films
Hong Kong martial arts films
Police detective films
Gun fu films
1980s Cantonese-language films
Films directed by Wong Jing
Films set in Hong Kong
Films shot in Hong Kong
1980s Hong Kong films